Joe Penner (born József Pintér; November 11, 1904 – January 10, 1941) was an American  vaudeville, radio, and film comedian.

Early life
Penner was an ethnic Hungarian born József Pintér in Nagybecskerek, Austria-Hungary, (present-day Zrenjanin, Serbia). His name was recorded as Josef Pinter on the steerage manifest of the RMS Slavonia, sailing from Fiume, Italy, May 4, and arriving at the Port of New York on May 23, 1907. He was accompanied by his sister, Maria, and their guardian, Istvan Molnar. They settled in Elkhart, Indiana.

Vaudeville and burlesque
Joe Penner first made his mark in local entertainments in Indiana. 
In 1917, his acts in which he dressed as Charlie Chaplin earned him 38 cents per week.

Thanks to his clowning and "Wanna Buy a Duck?" routine, he was soon in small-time burlesque and vaudeville. A high point came when he performed in the Greenwich Village Follies in Chicago in 1926. After this break, he toured in mainstream vaudeville until its gradual demise around 1932.

Radio
Penner's films include College Rhythm (1934), New Faces of 1937 
Penner developed his catch phrases in burlesque. In 1932 he toured in a vaudeville revue with Eddie Tamblyn, father of actor Russ Tamblyn. He was launched on his successful radio career by Rudy Vallée, appearances which led to his own Sunday evening half-hour, The Baker's Broadcast, which began on the Blue Network (a division of (NBC) October 8, 1933. Penner was a zany comic, noted for his famed catchphrase, "Wanna buy a duck?", and his low hyuck-hyuck laugh. Penner's other memorable catchphrase, often triggered by someone else's double entendre remark, was, "You naaaasss-ty man!" He was voted radio's top comedian in 1934, but a 1935 dispute with the ad agency over the show's format resulted in Penner quitting The Baker's Broadcast on June 30, 1935. Vox Pop began as a summer replacement series for Penner in 1935. A year later, he returned with The Joe Penner Show, which began airing October 4, 1936 on CBS, sponsored by Cocomalt, with Harry Conn as his new head writer.

Reception in film
He was caricatured by Tex Avery and Friz Freleng in the musical cartoon, "My Green Fedora", "Can You Take It?" a "Popeye the Sailor" cartoon (Max Fleischer for Paramount), and several pictures starring the bumbling stooge Egghead. 

After covering the 1932–34 rise of Jack Pearl, Elizabeth McLeod summed up Penner's popularity:The ultimate Depression-era zany was Joe Penner. A forgotten performer today to most, and little more than a footnote to the average OTR [old-time radio] fan, Penner was a national craze in 1933–34.  There is no deep social meaning in his comedy, no shades of subtlety — just utter slapstick foolishness, delivered in an endearingly simpering style that's the closest thing the 1930s had to Pee-wee Herman. An added attraction was Penner's in-character singing each week of a whimsical novelty song, specially written to suit his style. Like Pearl, however, Penner was doomed to early decline by the sheer repetitiveness of his format, even though he remained very popular with children right up to the end of his radio career. 

Part of the reason for Penner's relative obscurity in modern times is the lack of surviving recordings of Penner's work. His radio show aired in the early 1930s; widespread recording of popular radio shows began in 1936, just as his show was ending.

Personal life
In 1928, he married showgirl Eleanor May Vogt (1908–1946).

Penner died from a heart attack in his sleep in Philadelphia, Pennsylvania, in 1941, aged 36. His funeral in Los Angeles was attended by more than 2000 people.

Filmography
The Life of the Party (1937)
Mr. Doodle Kicks Off (1938)
Go Chase Yourself (1938)
The Day the Bookies Wept (1939)
Millionaire Playboy (1940)

He also made a cameo in the Disney cartoon "Mother Goose Goes Hollywood" in which he says, "Wanna buy a duck?", and then shows Donald Duck on a plate.

References

Listen to
 Joe Penner and Rudy Vallee on The Fleishmann's Yeast Hour July 13, 1933

External links

Joe Penner biography (in Hungarian) 
Wanna Buy a Duck?

1904 births
1941 deaths
Male actors from New York City
American male radio actors
Austro-Hungarian emigrants to the United States
Vaudeville performers
Burials at Forest Lawn Memorial Park (Glendale)
20th-century American male actors